Atencioite is a calcium iron phosphate mineral with the chemical formula CaFeMgBe(PO)(OH)·6HO. Its type locality is Divino das Laranjeiras, Minas Gerais, Brazil. It was named after Daniel Atencio, a mineralogy professor at the University of São Paulo.

References

External links 

 Atencioite data sheet

Calcium minerals
Iron(II) minerals
Phosphate minerals
Magnesium minerals
Beryllium minerals
Hydroxide minerals